The Ministry of Health, Community Development, Gender, Elders and Children is a government ministry of Tanzania. It deals with health policy, community development, gender and policy related to the elderly and children.

History 
The ministry was created as an amalgamation of the Ministry of Health and Social Welfare and Ministry of Community Development, Gender and Children under John Magufuli's 2015 cabinet.

Government Ministries of Tanzania
2015 establishments in Tanzania